Bianna Vitalievna Golodryga (Russian: Бианна Витальевна Голодрыга; Romanian: Bianna Golodrîga) born June 15, 1978) is a Moldovan-born American journalist and news anchor who is currently serving as a senior global affairs analyst at CNN. She was previously the news and finance anchor at Yahoo! News. She was also previously co-anchor of the weekend edition of ABC's Good Morning America and a co-host of CBS This Morning.

Early life and education
Golodryga was born to a working-class family of Bessarabian Jews in Căușeni, Moldavian Soviet Socialist Republic (now independent Moldova), the only child of Zhanna and Vitaly Golodryga.

In 1980, when she was 18 months old, her family left the Soviet Union as political refugees, each with $75. They settled in Houston, Texas, after initially moving to Galveston, Texas. She has returned to Moldova only once since then, visiting her grandparents and cousins in 1988. That same year, her grandmother joined them in Houston. Her mother is the chief digital and administrative officer for Phillips 66, and previously worked as chief information officer of Hess Corporation and her father, a mechanical engineer, was a consultant for DuPont.

Golodryga attended the High School for the Performing and Visual Arts in Houston but was interested in becoming a journalist instead of an actress. She was inspired to look closer at what was going on in the world after performing in a play about AIDS written by her teacher. She graduated from the University of Texas at Austin in May 2000, with a degree in Russian/East European & Eurasian studies and a minor in economics. She is fluent in Russian.

Career
Golodryga had planned for a career in the financial services industry after she graduated from college. She became a licensed trader and worked at several financial companies. After a sharp drop in the market, however, she decided to pursue journalism. She moved to New York in February 2001 and began working as a producer at CNBC, where she later became an on-air correspondent.

In 2004, Golodryga was named one of the top journalists under the age of 30. She was a correspondent for ABC between 2007 and 2010, and was named co-anchor of the weekend edition of Good Morning America in May 2010, following the departure of former co-anchor Kate Snow, who went to work for NBC.

In April 2013, Golodryga was the first person to interview Anzor Tsarnaev, the father of Boston Marathon bombers Tamerlan Tsarnaev and Dzhokhar Tsarnaev, and called this "the most emotional moment" of her career. At first, she assisted her colleagues with the proper pronunciation of the name, but then was tasked with calling Anzor in Chechnya. He had very few details to offer but called her back the next day, trying to find more information about what was happening and whether or not Dzhokhar, who had been taken into custody severely injured, was still alive.

Golodryga served as weekend co-anchor of Good Morning America until August 4, 2014, when she left it to join the business and finance news department of Yahoo! News. She was a guest host on Way Too Early and was a regular contributor to Morning Joe on MSNBC. In 2017 she was a guest co-anchor of the CBS Morning News. She joined CBS on a permanent basis as a correspondent in September 2017 and simultaneously joined CNN as a contributor.

In December 2016, Golodryga confronted then-Congressman Dana Rohrabacher, a Republican from California, over his defense of Russian President Vladimir Putin. At the time, Rohrabacher was considered a candidate to be appointed Secretary of State by then president-elect Donald Trump and was criticizing China for its record on human rights. Golodryga then asked about Putin, who has been consistently praised by Trump. Rohrabacher answered, "Oh, baloney. Where do you come from? How can you say that?" to which Golodryga replied, "I come from the former Soviet Union—that's where I came from. I came here as a political refugee. That's where I came from." Rohrabacher appeared flustered and accused Golodryga of being biased before he compared Putin to Mikhail Gorbachev.

Golodryga is a member of the Council on Foreign Relations. She has contributed to the HuffPost, most recently credited as a News and Finance Anchor at Yahoo!.

In 2015, Golodryga, whose husband was a former Bill Clinton staff member, was selected by Hillary Clinton to conduct Clinton's first interview as a presidential candidate. However, Clinton expressed her choice as "Bianna", which was misinterpreted by Clinton's staff as "Brianna" and an interview was scheduled with CNN's Brianna Keilar, who conducted a tough interview. Golodryga responded, "It happens all the time that my name gets butchered. I never thought it would impede me from participating in what would be one of the biggest stories of my life."

On October 3, 2018, it was announced on CBS This Morning that she would be joining the team as a co-host. On April 3, 2019, CBS News announced that she had chosen to leave the network. Later that year CNN announced that Golodryga had accepted a full-time role at the network as a senior global affairs analyst.

Allegations of Bias

In May 2021, during the 2021 Israel–Palestine crisis, Golodryga interviewed Shah Mahmood Qureshi, the Pakistani Minister of Foreign Affairs. During the interview, Qureshi said: "Israel is losing out. They are losing the media war, despite their connections." Golodryga asked  Qureshi: "What are their connections?" to which Qureshi replied: "Deep pockets," adding, "they are very influential people. They control media". Golodryga suggested that she considered this remark possibly anti-semitic. Other commentators have supported Qureshi's remarks.

Awards

Golodgryga is the recipient of an Emmy Award for Outstanding Morning Program, the Keystone Policy Center Leadership Award and the University of Texas at Austin Pro Bene Meritis Award among others.

Personal life

In September 2010, Golodryga married Peter R. Orszag, the former Director of the Office of Management and Budget for the Obama Administration and the CEO of Financial Advisory at Lazard, a financial services firm. They have a son and daughter.

She has completed the 2019 New York City Marathon in 4:01:37 and has run several half marathons in the New York City area.

See also

 New Yorkers in journalism
 Moldovan-Jewish Americans

References

External links
 
 

Living people
1978 births
ABC News personalities
20th-century American Jews
American television journalists
American women television journalists
American people of Moldovan-Jewish descent
University of Texas at Austin College of Liberal Arts alumni
Soviet emigrants to the United States
 
 
Moldovan diaspora
People from Houston
CNBC people
21st-century American journalists
People from Căușeni District
High School for the Performing and Visual Arts alumni
CBS people
CNN people
21st-century American women
21st-century American Jews
20th-century American women
Orszag family